Bob Ed Culver Jr. (born December 16, 1957) is an American politician who has served in the Oklahoma House of Representatives from the 4th district since 2020.

Early life
Culver was born on December 16, 1957 to Bob Ed Culver Sr. and Jo Ellen Culver (née Priest) in Tahlequah, Oklahoma. He graduated from Tahlequah High School in 1976. He then attended the University of Oklahoma, where he played as an offensive lineman for coach Barry Switzer. Culver went on to graduate in 1981 with a bachelor's degree in psychology. After college, he went on to run an independent oil and gas company near Canadian, Texas. In 2015, Culver and his family moved back to Tahlequah.

Political career
Culver first ran for the Oklahoma State House District 40 seat in 2016. After winning the Republican primary, he lost the general election to Democrat Matt Meredith by 325 votes. Culver ran for the seat again in 2020. He faced Rep. Meredith again in the general election, but Culver won this time by around 1,400 votes. With Meredith's defeat, Oklahoma Democrats had lost the last of their legislative seats in rural areas of the state. Culver was then sworn into office on November 16, 2020.

As of 2021, Culver is the vice chair of the House Judiciary-Civil Committee. He also serves on the County and Municipal Government Committee, State and Federal Redistricting Northeast Oklahoma Subcommittee, and Transportation Committee.

Personal life
Culver and his wife, Julie, have three children and five grandchildren. He and his family attend Tahlequah First United Methodist Church. His father, Bob Ed Sr., served in the Oklahoma House of Representatives for District 4 from 1990 to 2000.

Electoral history

2016 Oklahoma House of Representatives

2020 Oklahoma House of Representatives

References

External links
 Oklahoma State House Member's Page
 Campaign website

1957 births
Living people
Republican Party members of the Oklahoma House of Representatives
21st-century American politicians